Kinky is a Mexican rock band, formed in 1998 as part of the Avanzada Regia musical movement and consisting of Gilberto Cerezo, Ulises Lozano, Carlos Chairez, Omar Góngora, and Cesar Pliego. Although a majority of songs are sung in Spanish, some songs contain English lyrics. Kinky were discovered and signed by Sonic360 Records.

History

Kinky
Their first album, called Kinky, was released in early 2002, co-produced by Chris Allison. It was a success in Latin America, and had some success in the U.S. Their second single, titled "Más", was a success worldwide. "Más" was used in commercials for Nissan and the NBC Mexican Mafia mini-series Kingpin. It was also featured in the video games SSX 3 and Crackdown, and the movies Thirteen and Man on Fire, which featured another song by Kinky, "Field Goal". "Mas" was also used in an episode of CSI: Miami called "Silencer", season 4, episode 13 in which the band appeared at the beginning singing the song and the theatrical trailer of the film 2 Fast 2 Furious. The song titled "Cornman" was used in the PlayStation 3 video game, LittleBigPlanet

In 2002, they joined Cake, De La Soul, The Flaming Lips, Hackensaw Boys, and Modest Mouse on the Unlimited Sunshine Tour in the U.S - the band also appeared at the Coachella Valley Music and Arts Festival.

Atlas
In late 2003, the band released Atlas, their second studio album, the most alternative album of the band by far. Singles from Atlas included "Presidente", "Snapshot" and "La Hija del Caníbal".

Reina
In mid 2006, the band released Reina in an attempt to return to their electronic sound. Singles in the U.S. included "Sister Twisted" and "Uruapan Breaks"; in Mexico and Latin America, the song "A Dónde Van Los Muertos?" became a massive hit. Other Latin American singles included "León" and "Una Línea de Luz".

Barracuda
In 2008, Kinky released their fourth studio album Barracuda which was co-produced with Money Mark (Beastie Boys). With the hit songs "Hasta quemarnos" and "Those Girls", it launched the band on a world tour for two years.

Sueño de la Máquina
In mid-2012, Kinky's fifth studio album Sueño de la Máquina was released. It was produced and mixed by John King of the Dust Brothers. The first track "Inmovil" was licensed in the racing game LittleBigPlanet Karting.

Discography

Studio albums
 2002: Kinky
 2003: Atlas
 2006: Reina
 2008: Barracuda
 2011: Sueño de la Máquina
 2014: MTV Unplugged
 2017: Nada Vale Más Que Tú
 2022: Fierrro

Compilations
 2004: Oye Como Va
 2006: Rarities

In popular culture
The song "The Headphonist" was featured in the CBS series Without a Trace.

The song "The Headphonist" was featured in the FX series Nip Tuck.

The song "Más" is included in the video game SSX 3 and the movies Man on Fire and Thirteen, and is the song Ziva David is listening to in the NCIS episode "Shalom" (season 4 episode 1). It is also heard in the Alias episode "Countdown" (season 2, episode 20). It was used in a Taco Bell television commercial in 2012.

The song "Coqueta" is included in the video game FIFA 06.

The song "How Do They Do That" is included in the video game Tiger Woods PGA Tour 08.

The song "Uruapan Breaks" was featured in the Showtime series Dexter, and was included in the Soundtrack along with a reinterpretation of the series' Theme by Kinky.

The song "Cornman" was featured in the PlayStation 3 exclusive LittleBigPlanet.

The song "Papel Volando" from the album "Barracuda" was featured in The CW series Gossip Girl, in the episode "There Might Be Blood" from its second season.

The song "Little Boxes" was covered by Kinky for the theme of Season 3, Episode 3 of Weeds.

The song "I Say Hey" is playing during the party scene in the movie The Rocker.

References

External links 
Official site

Mexican electronic musical groups
Mexican rock music groups
Musical groups from Monterrey
Rock en Español music groups
Nettwerk Music Group artists